Greenhalgh v Arderne Cinemas Ltd (No 2) [1946] 1 All ER 512; [1951] Ch 286 is UK company law case concerning the issue of shares, and "fraud on the minority", as an exception to the rule in Foss v Harbottle.

Facts
Mr Greenhalgh was a minority shareholder in Arderne Cinemas and was in a protracted battle to prevent majority shareholder, Mr Mallard selling control. The company had two classes of shares; one class was worth ten shilling a share and the other class worth two shilling a share. The ten shillings were divided into two shilling shares, and all carried one vote. Mr Greenhalgh had the previous two shilling shares, and lost control of the company.

The articles of association provided by cl. 10 (a): "No shares in the company shall be transferred to a person not a member of the company so long as a member of the company may be willing to purchase such shares at a fair value to be ascertained in accordance with sub-clause (b) hereof".

The company changed its articles by special resolution in general meeting allowing existing shareholders to offer any shares to person/members outside the company. Mr Mallard, the majority shareholder, wished to transfer his shares for 6 shillings each to Mr Sol Sheckman in return for £5000 and his resignation from the board.

Mr Greenhalgh wished to prevent control of the company going away, and argued that the article change was invalid, a fraud on him and the other minority shareholders, and asked for compensation.

Judgments

Share issues
Lord Greene MR held, ‘instead of Greenhalgh finding himself in a position of control, he finds himself in a position where the control has gone, and to that extent the rights… are affected, as a matter of business. As a matter of law, I am quite unable to hold that, as a result of the transaction, the rights are varied; they remain what they always were – a right to have one vote per share pari passu with the ordinary shares for the time being issued which include the new 2s ordinary shares resulting from the subdivision.’ !

Derivative action
Lord Evershed MR (with whom Asquith and Jenkins LLJ concurred) held that the £5000 payment was not a fraud on the minority. None of the majority voters were voting for a private gain. The alteration of the articles was perfectly legitimate, because it was done properly.

Lord Evershed MR stated,

Moreover, it was wrong to say,

See also
UK company law
Allen v Gold Reefs of West Africa Ltd [1900] 1 Ch 656
Brown v British Abrasive Wheel Co [1919] 1 Ch 290
Sidebottom v Kershaw, Leese & Co Ltd [1920] 1 Ch 154
Dafen Tinplate Co Ltd v Llanelly Steel Co (1907) Ltd [1920] 2 Ch 124
Shuttleworth v Cox Bros and Co (Maidenhead) [1927] 1 Ch 154
Southern Foundries (1926) Ltd v Shirlaw [1940] AC 701

Notes

United Kingdom company case law
1946 in British law
1946 in case law
Court of Appeal (England and Wales) cases